LGU may refer to:

 Ladies' Golf Union, UK
 Lahore Garrison University, Punjab, Pakistan
 Land-grant university, a type of university in the United States
 Lebanese German University, Jounieh
 Logan-Cache Airport, Utah, US, IATA code
 Former London Guildhall University, UK
 Leningrad State University, Ленинградский государственный университет (Лгу)/Leningradsky gosudarstvenny universitet (LGU)
 Local government unit
 LG U+, a South Korean mobile network operator